Contents insurance is insurance that pays for damage to, or loss of, an individual’s personal possessions while they are located within that individual’s home. Some contents insurance policies also provide restricted cover for personal possessions temporarily taken away from the home by the policyholder.

In this context, "possessions" means anything that is not permanently attached to the structure of the home (possessions that are permanently attached to the structure of the home can only be insured via home insurance.)  Some contents policies may also include possessions kept in outbuildings or in the garden area attached to the house.

Contents insurance is usually sold alongside home insurance but it can also be purchased as a stand-alone policy, especially for those who are renting rather than owning their home.

See also
 Legal liability

External links 
 Household contents insurance - Adviceguide
Student Contents Insurance - Student Contents Insurance Guide

Types of insurance